The following is a complete episode list of the television series Top Gear Australia since its launch in 2008 on SBS One, and its subsequent move to the Nine Network in 2010. As of 13 September 2011, there have been 23 episodes spanning 4 seasons, as well as 1 promotional special, and the final episode of 4th season is currently not shown, because of the cancellation of the show. The show was presented by Steve Pizzati, Shane Jacobson, Ewen Page and The Stig. Pizzati was the only host to make the move from SBS to Nine, with Jacobson & Page replacing Warren Brown & James Morrison. Motorcycling commentator Charlie Cox presented in series 1.

Series overview

Episodes

Series 1 (2008)

Series 2 (2009)

Series 3 (2010)

Series 4 (2011–12)

External links

Top Gear Australia